Natalie Nichole Mihalek is an American politician. She is a Republican representing District 40 in the Pennsylvania House of Representatives.

Early life

Mihalek served in the United States Navy from 1997 to 2000. Aftwards, she earned a Bachelor's degree from the University of Pittsburgh in 2004 and a JD from the Appalachian School of Law in 2007. She worked as an Assistant District Attorney in Allegheny County from 2007 to 2010.

Political career

In 2018, Mihalek ran for election to represent District 40 in the Pennsylvania House of Representatives. She won a three-way Republican primary with 46.7% of the vote, and went on to win the general election with 56.1% of the vote. She was re-elected in 2020.

In November 2020, a man was arrested for stalking Mihalek and accused of soaping her district office's windows, apparently because Mihalek was unwilling to attempt to overturn Pennsylvania's 2020 presidential election results.

Committee assignments 

 Appropriations, Subcommittee on Education - Chair
 Judiciary
 Liquor Control
 Veterans Affairs & Emergency Preparedness

Electoral record

References

Year of birth missing (living people)
Living people
Republican Party members of the Pennsylvania House of Representatives
21st-century American politicians